Pack is a surname. People with the surname include:

 Carl Pack (1899–1945), New York politician
 Charles Lathrop Pack (1857–1937), businessman, philanthropist, philatelist
 David Pack (born 1952), American singer and musician
 Sir Denis Pack (1772–1823), Anglo-Irish military officer
 Frederick J. Pack (1875–1938), American geologist and writer
 George Pack Jr. (1800–1875), Canadian-American businessman, timberman
 George T. Pack (1898–1969), American oncologist
 George Willis Pack (1831–1906), Michigan timberman, millionaire
 Howard Pack (1918–2008), American shipping executive
 John Pack (1809–1885), member of the Church of the Latter Day Saints' Council of Fifty
 Michael Pack (born 1954), American documentary filmmaker
 Pamela Pack (b. 1979), American professional rock climber
 Randolph Greene Pack (1890–1956), American forester and philanthropist
 Robert Pack (b. 1929), American poet, critic, and educator
 Robert J. Pack (b. 1969), American basketball player and coach
 Sandra L. Pack, American accountant, financial officer, and government official
 W. Joe Pack (1875–1939), Justice of the Supreme Court of Mississippi
 Woodrow Landfair, "Pack" (b. 1982), American storyteller, adventurer, author

See also
Pak (surname), a variation of the Korean surname, Park